Suite  may refer to:

Arts and entertainment
Suite (music), a set of musical pieces considered as one composition
 Suite (Bach), a list of suites composed by J. S. Bach
 Suite (Cassadó), a mid-1920s composition by Gaspar Cassadó
 Suite (Penderecki), a 1994 composition by Krzysztof Penderecki
 :Category:Suites (music)
Suite, a set of related illustrations considered to be part of one art composition (e.g., the Vollard Suite by Picasso)
Suite!, a 2019 album by Roberto Magris
"Suite", a poem by Patti Smith from her book Babel
Suite PreCure, a series of the Pretty Cure anime franchise

Architecture and design
Suite (address), a kind of address or location in an office building, shopping mall, etc.
Suite (hotel), a type of hotel room
Secondary suite, an additional separate dwelling unit on a property that would normally accommodate only one dwelling unit

Other uses
Suite (geology), a lithodemic unit
Software suite, a collection of related software
Retinue, or suite, retainers in service of a dignitary
Living-room suite, a couch with two matching chairs

See also
Droit de suite, in copyright law, a right to compensation for resale of artworks
Suit (disambiguation)
Suite française (disambiguation)
Sweet (disambiguation)